Andre Begemann and Igor Zelenay were the defending champions but chose not to defend their title.

Michael Geerts and Patrik Niklas-Salminen won the title after defeating Fabian Fallert and Hendrik Jebens 7–6(7–5), 7–6(10–8) in the final.

Seeds

Draw

References

External links
 Main draw

Wolffkran Open - Doubles
2022 Doubles